Pierre-Daniel N'Guinda N'Diffon (born 18 June 1996) is a Cameroonian professional footballer who plays as a right-back for French  club Le Mans.

Club career
N'Guinda made his professional debut on 2 February 2017 in the Coupe de France round of 32 against Chambly. He started the game and was replaced in the 78th minute by Irvin Cardona in a 5–4 away win.

In July 2021, N'Guinda joined Créteil in the Championnat National.

Career statistics

References

External links
AS Monaco profile 
LFP profile

1996 births
Footballers from Douala
Cameroonian emigrants to France
Living people
Cameroonian footballers
French footballers
Association football defenders
AS Monaco FC players
US Quevilly-Rouen Métropole players
Cercle Brugge K.S.V. players
Kotkan Työväen Palloilijat players
US Créteil-Lusitanos players
Le Mans FC players
Championnat National 2 players
Ligue 2 players
Veikkausliiga players
Championnat National players
Cameroonian expatriate footballers
Expatriate footballers in Belgium
Cameroonian expatriate sportspeople in Belgium
Expatriate footballers in Finland
Cameroonian expatriate sportspeople in Finland